Some statutory nature reserves are designated by national bodies in the United Kingdom, and are known as national nature reserves.

Great Britain
In Great Britain, nature reserves designed under Part III of the National Parks and Access to the Countryside Act 1949 that are deemed to be of national importance may be designated as statutory 'national nature reserves' by the relevant national nature conservation body (Natural England, Scottish Natural Heritage, or Natural Resources Wales) using section 35(1) of the Wildlife and Countryside Act 1981.

If a nature reserve is designated by a local authority in Great Britain, then the resulting statutory nature reserve will be referred to as a local nature reserve.

England

In England, 229 national nature reserves are designated by Natural England.

Scotland

In Scotland, 43 national nature reserves are designated by NatureScot.

Wales

In Wales, 76 national nature reserves are designated by Natural Resources Wales.

Northern Ireland

In Northern Ireland, statutory nature reserves are designated by the Northern Ireland Environment Agency under the Nature Conservation and Amenity Lands (Northern Ireland) Order 1985. There are 47 NNRs in Northern Ireland.

See also
 Nature reserve
 National nature reserve
 Local nature reserve

References